Susan Sullivan is a Canadian politician in Newfoundland and Labrador, Canada. She represented the electoral district of Grand Falls-Windsor-Buchans in Newfoundland and Labrador House of Assembly from 2007 to 2015. She was a member of the Progressive Conservative Party.

She served in the provincial cabinet as Minister of Education and Early Childhood Development, Minister of Innovation, Business and Rural Development, Minister of Health and Community Services, Minister of Innovation, Trade and Rural Development and Minister of Human Resources, Labour and Employment. Prior to her entrance into provincial politics Sullivan had a 30-year teaching career and was the Deputy Mayor of Grand Falls-Windsor.

Background
Sullivan was born and raised in Grand Falls-Windsor, Newfoundland and Labrador. She studied at Memorial University of Newfoundland, where she obtained a Bachelor of Arts, majoring in French, and a Bachelor of Education. She received her Masters of Education from Mount St. Vincent University, in Halifax, as well she was awarded a French immersion diploma from Université Laval, in Quebec City. Sullivan had a 30-year teaching career and retired in June 2007. In her last seven years as an educator she was French Department Head for the Centre for Distance Learning and Innovation, during this time she taught senior high French to all parts of the province via the Internet. In 2005, she was elected Deputy Mayor of Grand Falls-Windsor and held this post until entering provincial politics.

Provincial politics
In June 2007, Sullivan defeated two others to win the Progressive Conservative Party nomination for the district of Grand Falls-Windsor-Buchans. In the three-person race, Sullivan captured 53 per cent of the 1,700 votes cast. The provincial election was set for October 9, 2007, but during the campaign Sullivan's Liberal opponent died suddenly. The election in the district was postponed due to the death and was held on November 6, 2007. After a big victory by the Progressive Conservatives in the general election, Sullivan took 72 per cent of the vote in the deferred election. On October 31, 2008, Premier Danny Williams appointed Sullivan to cabinet as the Minister of Human Resources, Labour and Employment and Minister responsible for Francophone Affairs. On December 6, 2010, Premier Kathy Dunderdale appointed Sullivan as Minister of Innovation, Trade, and Rural Development, Minister responsible for the Status of Women and she continued as Minister responsible for Francophone Affairs.

In the October 11, 2011 provincial election, Sullivan was easily re-elected as the member of the House of Assembly (MHA) for Grand Falls-Windsor-Buchans. Weeks later she was sworn in as the Minister of Health and Community Services. On May 1, 2014, Sullivan was moved to the Department of Innovation, Business and Rural Development. On September 5, 2014, she was given an additional role in cabinet as Minister responsible for the Status of Women. When Paul Davis took over as premier in September 2014, Sullivan was appointed Minister of Education and Early Childhood Development. On October 16, 2015, Sullivan announced that she would not seek re-election in the 2015 election.

Electoral record

|-

|-

|-

|NDP
|John Whelan
|align="right"|302
|align="right"|6.29%
|align="right"|
|}

 
|Progressive Conservative
|Susan Sullivan
|align=right|2,767
|align=right|71.83
|align="right"|
|-

|NDP
|Junior C. Downey
|align=right|922
|align=right|23.93
|align="right"|
|-

|}

References

External links
Susan Sullivan's PC Party biography
 

Living people
Members of the Executive Council of Newfoundland and Labrador
Memorial University of Newfoundland alumni
Mount Saint Vincent University alumni
Newfoundland and Labrador municipal councillors
People from Grand Falls-Windsor
Progressive Conservative Party of Newfoundland and Labrador MHAs
Women MHAs in Newfoundland and Labrador
21st-century Canadian politicians
21st-century Canadian women politicians
Women government ministers of Canada
Health ministers of Newfoundland and Labrador
Year of birth missing (living people)